The 1981 Omloop Het Volk was the 36th edition of the Omloop Het Volk cycle race and was held on 26 February 1981. The race started and finished in Ghent. The race was won by Jan Raas.

General classification

References

1981
Omloop Het Nieuwsblad
Omloop Het Nieuwsblad
February 1981 sports events in Europe